John F. Smith is an American soap opera writer and producer.

John F. Smith may also refer to:

 John F. Smith Jr. (born 1938), American businessperson
 Phenomenal Smith (John Francis Smith, 1864–1952), American baseball player
 John Frederick Smith (1806–1890), English novelist
 Ranger John Francis Smith, a fictional character
 John F. Smith (musician), British musician and trade unionist